Inyan Kara Mountain (Rock Gatherer ) is a mountain associated with the Bear Lodge Mountains of Crook County, Wyoming, (part of the Black Hills) that is considered sacred by the Lakota people, particularly for mothers in childbirth. The mountain was stated to rumble on quiet days by the local Native Americans and by early explorers. No mention of the noises is found after 1833; the noise has been attributed to gas escaping from burning coal seams.

The peak was visited by George Armstrong Custer during Custer's 1874 Black Hills Expedition, reaching the summit on July 23.

The peak was placed on the National Register of Historic Places in 1973.

Photo gallery

References

External links

 Inyan Kara Mountain at the Wyoming State Historic Preservation Office
 Inyan Kara Mountain at Black Hills National Forest
 Penry, Jerry. "Sacred Mountain—Climbing Inyan Kara" American Surveyor, The. Vol. 10, Issue 10, 27 September 2013

Mountains of Crook County, Wyoming
Mountains of Wyoming
Black Hills
Natural features on the National Register of Historic Places in Wyoming
Historic districts on the National Register of Historic Places in Wyoming
National Register of Historic Places in Crook County, Wyoming
Religious places of the indigenous peoples of North America